Antonie Gerrits (15 May 1885 – 22 January 1969) was a Dutch cyclist. He competed in four events at the 1908 Summer Olympics.

See also
 List of Dutch Olympic cyclists

References

External links
 

1885 births
1969 deaths
Dutch male cyclists
Olympic cyclists of the Netherlands
Cyclists at the 1908 Summer Olympics
Cyclists from Amsterdam